Potato fufu is a staple swallow food taken by the northern region of Nigeria. It is popular among the Yoruba tribe living in Kwara state. The swallow food is easy to make compared to pounded yam and its unique taste is why the food is prepared at weddings, parties and other occasions.

Overview 
The swallow food is made from cooked potato which can be supplemented with yam, cassava or flour to make it firm. Blender or mortar and pestle are used to mash the potato into desired size and shape.

Sweet potato 
Potato is a tuber harvested within 3–4 months of planting. Nigeria is one of the largest producer of potato and it can be processed into different products consumable by man of which one of them is potato fufu.

Soup 
Potato fufu is best eaten with  okra soup since it is easy to cook and the soup  takes lesser time to prepare.

See also 

 Fufu
 Mashed potato
 West African cuisine
 Ugali
 Staple food
 Soup
 African cuisine

References 

Yoruba cuisine
Nigerian cuisine
Staple foods
Swallows (food)